The 14th Asian Junior Table Tennis Championships 2008 were held in Singapore, from  23 to 27 July 2008. It was organised by the Singapore Table Tennis Association under the authority of the Asian Table Tennis Union (ATTU) and International Table Tennis Federation (ITTF).

Medal summary

Events

Medal table

See also

2008 World Junior Table Tennis Championships
Asian Table Tennis Championships
Asian Table Tennis Union

References

Asian Junior and Cadet Table Tennis Championships
Asian Junior and Cadet Table Tennis Championships
Asian Junior and Cadet Table Tennis Championships
Asian Junior and Cadet Table Tennis Championships
Table tennis competitions in Singapore
International sports competitions hosted by Singapore
Asian Junior and Cadet Table Tennis Championships